Melvin Manhoef (born 11 May 1976) is a retired Surinamese-born Dutch mixed martial artist and kickboxer. In kickboxing, he is a former It's Showtime Middleweight Champion, and in MMA he was the Cage Rage Light Heavyweight Champion. In mixed martial arts, he competed in Bellator's Light heavyweight and Middleweight division and has also formerly competed for Strikeforce, DREAM, RINGS, It's Showtime, K-1, ONE FC, and KSW. 29 of his 32 wins have come via knockout, the highest percentage of any MMA fighter with at least 15 wins.

Background
Manhoef was born in Paramaribo, Suriname. When he was three years old his family moved to Rotterdam, the Netherlands. Manhoef played soccer during his youth, and was introduced to Muay Thai by his younger brother, Moreno.

Mixed martial arts career

Early career 
At the age of 18, Manhoef had his first fight, which he won by decision. He made his comeback in September 2001, as part of Chakuriki Gym. In 2004, Manhoef entered the Cage Rage promotion in London. He became the British Cage Rage Light Heavyweight Champion by beating Fabio Piamonte at Cage Rage 13. He defended his title for almost two years, until entering the K-1's MMA affiliate promotion Hero's in 2006. He won his first fight at Hero's 4 against Shungo Oyama by technical knockout in first round.

Melvin has switched his main focus to MMA over the past couple of years. He lost to Dong-sik Yoon by submission armbar in K-1 Dynamite!! USA, he defeated Bernard Ackah at K-1 Hero's Middleweight Tournament Opening Round, and also got a TKO win against Fábio Silva, a Chute Boxe fighter, by TKO in K-1 Hero's Middleweight GP Final. At Dream 4 Melvin fought Kazushi Sakuraba. Manhoef and Sakuraba circled the ring for the first minute of the fight, before Manhoef dropped Sakuraba with a hard right head kick and finished him via TKO (hammerfists) at 90 seconds into Round 1. With the win, Melvin had advanced to the semifinal round of the DREAM Middleweight Grand Prix. At Dream 6 Melvin fought Gegard Mousasi as the tournament dictated. Wary of Manhoef's standup, Mousasi quickly took the fight to the ground despite attempts to shrug him with a sprawl. Mousasi took Manhoef's back until scrambling into a triangle choke at 1:28 of the first round, surviving a powerful slam attempt from Manhoef while he had the submission secured. Mousasi went on to win the DREAM Middleweight Grand Prix.

At Dynamite!! 2008 Melvin fought Mark Hunt as a late alternate at heavyweight, despite usually functioning at two weight classes below his opponent. Regardless of the size disadvantage, he knocked down the iron-jawed Samoan in 18 seconds and followed with punches as he was postured over Hunt, until the referee stopped the fight. It was the first time Hunt was finished by knockout in his MMA career. He fought former WEC Middleweight Champion Paulo Filho on 20 July 2009 at Dream 10. Despite early success on the feet with his striking offensive, Manhoef was taken down and submitted via armbar in the first round.

Manhoef signed a multi-year fight contract with Strikeforce.
Manhoef made his debut for the organization against Robbie Lawler on 30 January 2010 at Strikeforce: Miami. Despite a strong start with heavy leg kicks and punches, he was knocked out at 3:33 in the first round.

Manhoef fought Tatsuya Mizuno at Dream 15 and lost by submission.

Manhoef returned to the United States in March 2011, facing Tim Kennedy at Strikeforce: Feijao vs. Henderson. He lost the fight via submission in the first round.

On 31 January 2012 it was announced that Manhoef had signed with ONE Fighting Championship and would be fighting Renato Sobral in the main event at ONE Fighting Championship 3.  However, Sobral pulled out of the fight and Manhoef faced Yoshiyuki Nakanishi.  The fight ended in a No Contest due to an accidental injury to Manhoef's leg in round 1. Manhoef scored a knockout victory on 6 October 2012 against Ryo Kawamura, followed by a quick knockout of Dennis Kang on 31 December 2012. Melvin is now on a three-fight win streak in MMA and has gone 4–0 on New Year's Eve.

Recently Manhoef was training with the famous Black House in the United States. He helped his teammate Lyoto Machida train for a fight with Dan Henderson. Manhoef openly hopes to sign with the UFC after visiting UFC 156 in Las Vegas and meeting with Dana White.

In 2013 Manhoef fought UFC veteran Brock Larson at ONE FC on 5 April. After controlling the standup and Larson literally running away from him, Manhoef was repeatedly taken down in the last two rounds and Larson won via unanimous decision.  He lost to Mamed Khalidov at KSW23 on 8 June 2013.

He lost to Zabit Samedov by unanimous decision in the semi-finals of the 93 kg/205 lb kickboxing tournament at Legend 2: Invasion in Moscow, Russia on 9 November 2013.

Manhoef faced Evangelista Santos in a much-anticipated rematch for the Gringo Super Fight Welterweight title on 27 April. The fight was Melvin's first at 170 lbs. Manhoef won the bout via TKO, early in the first round.

It was announced during the Glory 15: Istanbul broadcast that Manhoef would be one of eight fighters competing in the Glory 17: Los Angeles - Last Man Standing middleweight tournament in Inglewood, California, United States on 21 June 2014. He lost to Filip Verlinden in the quarter-finals, suffering a head kick knockdown in round one before losing a majority decision.

Bellator MMA 

On 21 July 2014, Bellator MMA announced that they signed Paul Daley along with Melvin Manhoef.

Manhoef made his Bellator debut against Doug Marshall, in a middleweight bout, at Bellator 125 on 19 September 2014. He won the fight via knockout in the first round.

Manhoef faced Glory veteran Joe Schilling on 15 November 2014 at Bellator 131. After a dominant first round that saw Manhoef drop Schilling twice, he lost the fight in the second round due to a knockout.

Manhoef next faced Alexander Shlemenko on 13 February 2015 at Bellator 133. He lost via knockout early in the second round. On 17 March 2015 Shlemenko was suspended indefinitely for failing a post fight drug test with elevated testosterone levels. The fight result was changed to a no contest.

Manhoef faced Rafael Carvalho on 20 May 2016 for the Bellator Middleweight World Championship at Bellator 155. Manhoef lost a controversial split decision. Bellator announcer Jimmy Smith called it one of the worst decisions he had ever seen in the promotion; likewise, 5 of 5 media outlets scored the bout in favor of Manhoef.

An immediate rematch with Carvalho was scheduled to take place at Bellator 168, on 10 December 2016. However, Carvalho pulled out of the fight due to injury. The rematch eventually took place on 8 April 2017 at Bellator 176. Manhoef lost the bout via knockout due to a head kick in the fourth round.

Manhoef made a comeback to kickboxing and faced Remy Bonjasky for the fourth time, after losing three times, on 29 October 2017. Manhoef won the bout by decision. He announced his retirement from kickboxing and stated that he would focus on his MMA career.

In May 2018 it was revealed that Manhoef and Bellator had come to terms for an exclusive, multi-fight contract.

Manhoef was scheduled to face Chidi Njokuani on 30 November 2018 at Bellator 210. However, on 1 November 2018 it was reported that Manhoef pulled out from the event due to injury and he was replaced by John Salter.

After over two years away from MMA action, Manhoef returned and faced Kent Kauppinen at Bellator 223. He won the fight by unanimous decision.

As the ultimate bout of his prevailing contract, Manhoef next headlined Bellator Milan against Yannick Bahati on 12 October 2019. Manhoef won the bout via technical knockout in the first round. Subsequently, Manhoef signed a two-fight contract extension with the organization.

Manhoef was next expected to face Simon Biyong at Bellator 248 on 10 October 2020. However, the bout was scrapped an Manhoef instead faced Corey Anderson at Bellator 251 on 5 November 2020. He was defeated via second round TKO.

Manhoef was scheduled to fight Yoel Romero on May 6, 2022 at Bellator 280. However, Manhoef withdrew from the bout due to a hand injury and was replaced by Alex Polizzi. The pair was rescheduled to meet at Bellator 285 on September 23, 2022. He lost the bout via knockout on the ground via elbows in the third round. Manhoef retired from mixed martial arts after the fight.

Post Bellator 
Despite his retirement months ago, Manhoef faced Igor Tanabe on December 28, 2022 at Inoki Bom-Ba-Ye x Ganryujima. He was submitted via heel hook in the first round and once again announced his retirement.

Business career
Manhoef founded a kickboxing and MMA-promotion named World Fighting League.

Personal life
On 29 March 2022, Manhoef and other neighbourhood residents apprehended three alleged burglars who had targeted his home near Amsterdam. He stopped the men from fleeing in a car by performing a PIT maneuver, and then, with the assistance of neighbours, detained the suspects until police arrived. Manhoef gave a statement to police afterwards, although legal ramifications of his actions are unclear.

Championships and accomplishments

Kickboxing
It's Showtime 
It's Showtime 85 kg MAX champion (One time, first)

Mixed martial arts
Cage Rage
Cage Rage Light Heavyweight Champion (One time)
Two Successful Title Defenses
DREAM
DREAM Middleweight Grand Prix Semifinalist
K-1 Hero's
2006 Hero's Light Heavyweight Finalist
Sherdog
2012 All-Violence First Team
Gringo Super Fight
2014 GSF Welterweight Champion

Mixed martial arts record

|-
|Loss
|align=center| 32–17–1 (2) 
|Igor Tanabe
|Submission (inverted heel hook)
|Inoki Bom-Ba-Ye x Ganryujima
|
|align=center|1
|align=center|1:58
|Sumida, Tokyo, Japan
|
|-
|Loss
|align=center| 32–16–1 (2)
|Yoel Romero
|KO (elbows)
|Bellator 285
|
|align=center| 3
|align=center| 3:34
|Dublin, Ireland
|
|-
| Loss
| align=center| 32–15–1 (2)
| Corey Anderson
| TKO (elbows)
| Bellator 251
| 
| align=center| 2
| align=center| 2:34
| Uncasville, Connecticut, United States
|
|-
| Win
| align=center| 32–14–1 (2)
| Yannick Bahati
| TKO (punches)
| Bellator 230
| 
| align=center| 1
| align=center| 2:29
| Milan, Italy
| 
|-
| Win
| align=center| 31–14–1 (2)
| Kent Kauppinen
| Decision (unanimous)
|Bellator 223
| 
| align=center| 3
| align=center| 5:00
| London, England
|  
|-
| Loss
| align=center| 30–14–1 (2)
| Rafael Carvalho
| KO (head kick)
| Bellator 176
| 
| align=center| 4
| align=center| 3:15
| Torino, Italy
| 
|-
| Loss
| align=center| 30–13–1 (2)
| Rafael Carvalho
| Decision (split)
| Bellator 155
| 
| align=center| 5 
| align=center| 5:00
| Boise, Idaho, United States
| 
|-
| Win
| align=center| 30–12–1 (2)
| Hisaki Kato
| KO (punch)
| Bellator 146
| 
| align=center| 1
| align=center| 3:43
| Thackerville, Oklahoma, United States
| 
|-
| NC
| align=center| 29–12–1 (2)
| Alexander Shlemenko
|  NC (overturned) 
| Bellator 133
| 
| align=center| 2
| align=center| 1:25
| Fresno, California, United States
| 
|-
| Loss
| align=center| 29–12–1 (1)
| Joe Schilling
| KO (punches)
| Bellator 131
| 
| align=center| 2
| align=center| 0:32
| San Diego, California, United States
| 
|-
| Win
| align=center| 29–11–1 (1)
| Doug Marshall
| KO (punch)
| Bellator 125
| 
| align=center| 1
| align=center| 1:45
| Fresno, California, United States
| 
|-
| Win
| align=center| 28–11–1 (1)
| Evangelista Santos
| TKO (punches)
| Gringo Super Fight 10
| 
| align=center| 1
| align=center| 0:46
| Rio de Janeiro, Brazil
| 
|-
| Loss
| align=center| 27–11–1 (1)
| Mamed Khalidov
| Submission (guillotine choke)
| KSW 23
| 
| align=center| 1
| align=center| 2:09
| Gdańsk, Poland
| 
|-
| Loss
| align=center|  (1)
| Brock Larson
| Decision (unanimous) 
| ONE Fighting Championship: Kings and Champions
| 
| align=center| 3
| align=center| 5:00
| Kallang, Singapore
| 
|-
| Win
| align=center| 27–9–1 (1)
| Denis Kang
| TKO (knee to the body)
| Dream 18
| 
| align=center| 1
| align=center| 0:50
| Saitama, Saitama, Japan
| 
|-
| Win
| align=center| 26–9–1 (1)
| Ryo Kawamura
| KO (punch)
| ONE FC: Rise of Kings
| 
| align=center| 1
| align=center| 4:40
| Kallang, Singapore
| 
|-
| Win
| align=center| 25–9–1 (1)
| Jae Young Kim
| Decision (split)
| Road FC 9: Beatdown
| 
| align=center| 3
| align=center| 5:00
| Wonju Chiak Indoor Gym, South Korea
| 
|-
| NC
| align=center| 24–9–1 (1)
| Yoshiyuki Nakanishi
| NC
| ONE FC: War of the Lions
| 
| align=center| 1
| align=center| 2:08
| Kallang, Singapore
| 
|-
| Loss
| align=center| 24–9–1
| Tim Kennedy
| Submission (rear-naked choke)
| Strikeforce: Feijao vs. Henderson
| 
| align=center| 1
| align=center| 3:41
| Columbus, Ohio, United States
| 
|-
| Loss
| align=center| 24–8–1
| Tatsuya Mizuno
| Submission (kimura)
| Dream 15
| 
| align=center| 1
| align=center| 7:38
| Saitama, Saitama, Japan
| 
|-
| Loss
| align=center| 24–7–1
| Robbie Lawler
| KO (punch)
| Strikeforce: Miami
| 
| align=center| 1
| align=center| 3:33
| Sunrise, Florida, United States
| 
|-
| Win
| align=center| 24–6–1
| Kazuo Misaki
| TKO (punches)
| Dynamite!! The Power of Courage 2009
| 
| align=center| 1
| align=center| 1:49
| Saitama, Saitama, Japan
| 
|-
| Loss
| align=center| 23–6–1
| Paulo Filho
| Submission (armbar)
| Dream 10
| 
| align=center| 1
| align=center| 2:35
| Saitama, Saitama, Japan
| 
|-
| Win
| align=center| 23–5–1
| Mark Hunt
| KO (punches)
| Fields Dynamite!! 2008
| 
| align=center| 1
| align=center| 0:18
| Saitama, Saitama, Japan
| 
|-
| Loss
| align=center| 22–5–1
| Gegard Mousasi
| Submission (triangle choke)
| Dream 6: Middleweight Grand Prix 2008 Final Round
| 
| align=center| 1
| align=center| 1:28
| Saitama, Saitama, Japan
| 
|-
| Win
| align=center| 22–4–1
| Kazushi Sakuraba
| KO (punches)
| Dream 4: Middleweight Grand Prix 2008 Second Round
| 
| align=center| 1
| align=center| 1:30
| Yokohama, Japan
| 
|-
| Win
| align=center| 21–4–1
| Dae Won Kim
| TKO (knee and punches)
| Dream 3: Lightweight Grand Prix 2008 Second Round
| 
| align=center| 1
| align=center| 4:08
| Saitama, Saitama, Japan
| 
|-
| Win
| align=center| 20–4–1
| Yosuke Nishijima
| TKO (punches)
| K-1 PREMIUM 2007 Dynamite!!
| 
| align=center| 1
| align=center| 1:49
| Osaka, Japan
| 
|-
| Win
| align=center| 19–4–1
| Fábio Silva
| TKO (punches)
| Hero's 10
| 
| align=center| 1
| align=center| 1:00
| Yokohama, Japan
| 
|-
| Win
| align=center| 18–4–1
| Bernard Ackah
| TKO (punches)
| Hero's 9
| 
| align=center| 1
| align=center| 2:13
| Yokohama, Japan
| 
|-
| Loss
| align=center| 17–4–1
| Dong Sik Yoon
| Submission (armbar)
| K-1 Dynamite!! USA
| 
| align=center| 2
| align=center| 1:17
| Los Angeles, California, United States
| 
|-
| Win
| align=center| 17–3–1
| Yoshiki Takahashi
| TKO (punches)
| Hero's 8
| 
| align=center| 1
| align=center| 2:36
| Nagoya, Japan
| 
|-
| Loss
| align=center| 16–3–1
| Yoshihiro Akiyama
| Submission (armbar)
| Hero's 7
| 
| align=center| 1
| align=center| 1:58
| Yokohama, Japan
| 
|-
| Win
| align=center| 16–2–1
| Shungo Oyama
| TKO (punches)
| Hero's 7
| 
| align=center| 1
| align=center| 1:04
| Yokohama, Japan
| 
|-
| Win
| align=center| 15–2–1
| Crosley Gracie
| TKO (punches)
| Hero's 6
| 
| align=center| 1
| align=center| 9:12
| Tokyo, Japan
| 
|-
| Win
| align=center| 14–2–1
| Ian Freeman
| KO (punches)
| Cage Rage 17
| 
| align=center| 1
| align=center| 0:17
| London, England
| 
|-
| Win
| align=center| 13–2–1
| Shungo Oyama
| TKO (doctor stoppage)
| Hero's 4
| 
| align=center| 1
| align=center| 2:51
| Tokyo, Japan
| 
|-
| Win
| align=center| 12–2–1
| Evangelista Santos
| KO (punches)
| Cage Rage 15
| 
| align=center| 2
| align=center| 3:51
| London, England
| 
|-
| Win
| align=center| 11–2–1
| Fabio Piamonte
| KO (punches)
| Cage Rage 13
| 
| align=center| 1
| align=center| 0:51
| London, England
| 
|-
| Win
| align=center| 
| Paul Cahoon
| TKO (punches)
| CFC 4 Cage Carnage
| 
| align=center| 1
| align=center| N/A
| Liverpool, England
| 
|-
| Win
| align=center| 9–2–1
| Bob Schrijber
| Decision (unanimous)
| It's Showtime Boxing & MMA Event 2005 Amsterdam
| 
| align=center| 2
| align=center| 5:00
| Amsterdam, Netherlands
| 
|-
| Win
| align=center| 8–2–1
| Ladislav Zak
| TKO (corner stoppage)
| Queens Fight Night
| 
| align=center| 1
| align=center| 0:37
| Eindhoven, Netherlands
| 
|-
| Win
| align=center| 7–2–1
| Matthias Riccio
| TKO (punches)
| Cage Rage 10
| 
| align=center| 1
| align=center| 3:01
| London, England
| 
|-
| Loss
| align=center| 6–2–1
| Rodney Glunder
| KO (punches)
| It's Showtime 2004 Amsterdam
| 
| align=center| 2
| align=center| 4:43
| Amsterdam, Netherlands
| 
|-
| Win
| align=center| 6–1–1
| Slavomir Molnar
| KO (punches)
| Heaven or Hell 4
| 
| align=center| 1
| align=center| N/A
| Prague, Czech Republic
| 
|-
| Win
| align=center| 5–1–1
| Alexandr Garkushenko
| TKO (punches)
| M-1 MFC: Russia vs. the World 5
| 
| align=center| 1
| align=center| 6:57
| Saint Petersburg, Russia
| 
|-
| Loss
| align=center| 4–1–1
| Bob Schrijber
| KO (punches)
| 2H2H 11: Simply the Best
| 
| align=center| 1
| align=center| 4:04
| Rotterdam, Netherlands
| 
|-
| Win
| align=center| 4–0–1
| Mika Ilmén
| KO (punch)
| It's Showtime – As Usual / Battle Time
| 
| align=center| 1
| align=center| 0:35
| Haarlem, Netherlands
| 
|-
| Win
| align=center| 3–0–1
| Paul Cahoon
| TKO (corner stoppage)
| Rings Holland: Saved by the Bell
| 
| align=center| 2
| align=center| 2:07
| Amsterdam, Netherlands
| 
|-
| Win
| align=center| 2–0–1
| Husein Cift
| KO (punches)
| Hoogwoud Free Fight Gala
| 
| align=center| 1
| align=center| 1:50
| Hoogwoud, Netherlands
| 
|-
| Draw
| align=center| 1–0–1
| Rodney Glunder
| Draw
| Rings Holland: The Kings of the Magic Ring
| 
| align=center| 2
| align=center| 5:00
| Utrecht, Netherlands
| 
|-
| Win
| align=center| 1–0
| Jordy Jonkers
| TKO (palm strike and head kick)
| Battle of Amstelveen II
| 
| align=center| 2
| align=center| 3:37
| Amstelveen, Netherlands
|

Kickboxing record (incomplete)

|-
|-  bgcolor= "#CCFFCC"
| 2017-10-29 || Win ||align=left| Remy Bonjasky || WFL: Manhoef vs. Bonjasky, Final 16 || Almere, Netherlands || Decision || 3 || 3:00
|-
|-  bgcolor="#ffbbbb"
| 2016-04-16 || Loss ||align=left| Alexandru Negrea || Bellator Kickboxing 1 || Turin, Italy || Decision (Unanimous) || 3 || 3:00  
|-
|-  bgcolor="#ffbbbb"
| 2014-07-25 || Loss ||align=left| César Córdoba || International Fighting Championship || Badalona, Spain || TKO (Referee stoppage)  || 1 || 2:59
|-  bgcolor="#ffbbbb"
| 2014-06-21 || Loss ||align=left|  Filip Verlinden || Glory 17: Los Angeles - Middleweight Last Man Standing Tournament, Quarter Finals || Inglewood, California, USA || Decision (Majority) || 3 || 3:00
|-  bgcolor="#ffbbbb"
| 2013-11-09 || Loss ||align=left|  Zabit Samedov || Legend 2: Invasion, Semi Finals || Moscow, Russia || Decision (Unanimous) || 3 || 3:00
|-
|- style="" bgcolor="#ffbbbb"
| 2012-01-28 || Loss ||align=left| Tyrone Spong || It's Showtime 2012 in Leeuwarden || Leeuwarden, Netherlands || Decision (Unanimous)|| 3 || 3:00
|-  bgcolor="#ffbbbb"
| 2010-05-29 || Loss ||align=left| Gokhan Saki || It's Showtime 2010 Amsterdam || Amsterdam, Netherlands || TKO (Referee stoppage) || 2 || N/A
|-  bgcolor="#ffbbbb"
| 2009-09-26 || Loss ||align=left| Remy Bonjasky || K-1 World Grand Prix 2009 Final 16 || Seoul, Republic of Korea || Decision (Unanimous) || 3 || 3:00
|-
! style=background:white colspan=9 |
|-
|-  bgcolor="#CCFFCC"
| 2009-08-29 || Win ||align=left| Dénes Rácz || It's Showtime 2009 Budapest || Budapest, Hungary || TKO (Referee stoppage) || 3 || 0:46
|-
! style=background:white colspan=9 |
|-
|-  bgcolor="#CCFFCC"
| 2009-08-11 || Win ||align=left| Ramazan Ramazanov || K-1 World Grand Prix 2009 in Tokyo, Quarter Finals || Tokyo, Japan || KO (Punch) || 1 || 2:16
|-
! style=background:white colspan=9 |
|-
|-  bgcolor="#CCFFCC"
| 2009-05-16 || Win ||align=left| Stefan Leko || It's Showtime 2009 Amsterdam || Amsterdam, Netherlands || TKO (Referee stoppage) || 3 || N/A
|-  bgcolor="#ffbbbb"
| 2009-03-28 || Loss ||align=left| Kyotaro || K-1 World GP 2009 in Yokohama, Semi Finals || Yokohama, Japan || KO (Right hook) || 1 || 2:02
|-  bgcolor="#CCFFCC"
| 2008-12-06 || Win ||align=left| Paul Slowinski || K-1 World GP 2008 Final, Reserve Fight || Tokyo, Japan || KO (Left hook) || 1 || 2:26
|-  bgcolor="#ffbbbb"
| 2008-04-26 || Loss ||align=left| Remy Bonjasky || K-1 World GP 2008 in Amsterdam || Amsterdam, Netherlands || KO (Flying right high kick) || 3 || 2:32
|-  bgcolor="#CCFFCC"
| 2007-06-23 || Win ||align=left| Ruslan Karaev || K-1 World Grand Prix 2007 in Amsterdam || Amsterdam, Netherlands || KO (Left hook) || 1 || 0:31
|-  bgcolor="#ffbbbb"
| 2006-12-02 || Loss ||align=left| Ray Sefo || K-1 World Grand Prix 2006, Reserve Fight || Tokyo, Japan || KO (Right hook) || 1 || 0:40
|-  bgcolor="#CCFFCC"
| 2006-05-13 || Win ||align=left| Tatsufumi Tomihira || K-1 World Grand Prix 2006 in Amsterdam, Quarter Finals || Amsterdam, Netherlands || KO (Punches) || 1 || 2:10
|-
! style=background:white colspan=9 |
|-
|-  bgcolor="#CCFFCC"
| 2005-04-09 || Win ||align=left| Yuji Sakuragi || Muay Thai Champions League XIV || Amsterdam, Netherlands || TKO (Referee stoppage) || 2 || N/A
|-  bgcolor="#ffbbbb"
| 2005-02-12 || Loss ||align=left| Dzevad Poturak || Gala Gym Alkmaar || Alkmaar, Netherlands || KO (Punches) || 3 || 2:55
|-  bgcolor="#CCFFCC"
| 2002-04-21|| Win ||align=left| Stavros Anastiadis || Victory or Hell 3 || Amsterdam, Netherlands || KO (Knee strike) || 1 || N/A
|-  bgcolor="#ffbbbb"
| 2002-02-24 || Loss ||align=left| Remy Bonjasky || K-1 World Grand Prix 2002 Preliminary Netherlands, Quarter Finals || Arnhem, Netherlands || Decision (Unanimous) || 3 || 3:00
|-  bgcolor="#ffbbbb"
| 1999-03-27 || Loss ||align=left| Ashwin Balrak || The Fights of the Gladiators || Amsterdam, Netherlands || Decision (Unanimous) || 5 || 3:00
|-  bgcolor="#CCFFCC"
| 1998-09-26|| Win ||align=left| Jean Jacques || The Fight of the Champions || Amsterdam, Netherlands || KO (Left hook) || 2 || N/A
|-  bgcolor="#ffbbbb"
| 1996-09-28 || Loss ||align=left| Lesley Nijman || Thai/Kickboxing Zaandam || Zaandam, Netherlands || KO || N/A || N/A
|-  bgcolor="#ffbbbb"
| 1996-03-16 || Loss ||align=left| Samir Benazzouz || Thai/Kickboxing Nijmegen || Nijmegen, Netherlands || KO || 3 || N/A
|-
| colspan=8 | Legend:

See also
List of K-1 events
List of K-1 champions
List of It's Showtime champions
List of male kickboxers
List of Bellator MMA alumni
List of male mixed martial artists

References

External links
 
 

1976 births
Living people
Dutch male kickboxers
Dutch Muay Thai practitioners
Dutch practitioners of Brazilian jiu-jitsu
Dutch male mixed martial artists
Heavyweight kickboxers 
Middleweight kickboxers
Light heavyweight mixed martial artists
Middleweight mixed martial artists
Mixed martial artists utilizing Muay Thai
Mixed martial artists utilizing Brazilian jiu-jitsu
Sportspeople from Paramaribo
Sportspeople from Rotterdam
Surinamese emigrants to the Netherlands
Surinamese male kickboxers
Surinamese Muay Thai practitioners
Surinamese practitioners of Brazilian jiu-jitsu
Surinamese male mixed martial artists
Glory kickboxers
Bellator male fighters
Dutch sportspeople of Surinamese descent